Joseph John is the name of:

 Joseph John (Reverend) (1925 - ?), reverend of the Church of South India 
 Joe John (born 1939), member of the North Carolina House of Representatives
 Joseph A. John (1880 - 1943), Black Catholic priest for the Society of African Missions and later the Archdiocese of Port of Spain